{{Infobox television
| image                = SpartacusMiniseries.jpg
| image_size           =
| image_alt            = 
| caption              = UK Region 2 DVD cover
| genre                = DramaAction
| creator              = 
| based_on             = 
| writer               = Teleplay:Robert Schenkkan
| screenplay           = 
| story                = 
| director             = Robert Dornhelm
| starring             = Goran VisnjicAlan BatesAngus MacfadyenRhona MitraIan McNeiceRoss KempBen Cross
| narrated             = 
| theme_music_composer = Randy Miller
| country              = United States
| language             = English
| num_episodes         = 2
| producer             = Ted Kurdyla
| editor               = Mark ConteVictor Du BoisCindy Mollo
| cinematography       = Kees Van Oostrum
| runtime              = 171 minutes
| company              = 
| distributor          = Kurdyla EntertainmentFuel EntertainmentVesuvius ProductionsUSA Cable Entertainment
| budget               = 
| network              = USA Network
| first_aired          = 
| last_aired           = 
| preceded_by          = 
| followed_by          =  
}}Spartacus''' is a 2004 North American miniseries directed by Robert Dornhelm and produced by Ted Kurdyla from a teleplay by Robert Schenkkan. It aired over two nights on the USA Network, and stars Goran Visnjic, Alan Bates (in his final television appearance), Angus Macfadyen, Rhona Mitra, Ian McNeice, Ross Kemp and Ben Cross. It is based on the 1951 novel of the same name by Howard Fast.

The plot, setting, and costumes are nearly identical to those of Stanley Kubrick's 1960 version; however, this adaptation follows Howard Fast's novel more closely than does Kubrick's film. (Two of the more noticeable omissions from the new adaptation are the "I am Spartacus!" scene and the reunion of Spartacus and his wife after the battle.) The miniseries is shown as a story a woman narrates to her son, who are later revealed to be Spartacus' wife and son.

A notable piece of dramatic license has Spartacus' son born exactly at the moment Spartacus dies in battle.
As Marcus Crassus and Pompey Magnus are being proclaimed co-consuls, the announcer calls Rome an Empire, when it was still a Republic at the time. However, in  contemporary Latin, the meaning of “Imperium“, empire, just meant area where one exercises power.

Plot
The Gaul woman Varinia (Rhona Mitra) and her village are attacked by the Romans. Her entire village is taken into slavery, and she is sold to Lentulus Batiatus (Ian McNeice). Spartacus (Goran Višnjić), a Thracian slave condemned to the mines, attempts to protect another slave. Spartacus is nearly crucified before Batiatus purchases the man. Spartacus and a handful of other slaves are brought to Batiatus' ludus to be trained as gladiators. Spartacus and the other slaves are brought to the gladiators to eat, where he meets Nardo (Chris Jarman), Draba (Henry Simmons) and David (James Frain). Before a fight breaks out between Draba and Gannicus (Paul Telfer), they are stopped by their trainer Cinna (Ross Kemp).

Cast
 Goran Višnjić as Spartacus
 Alan Bates as Antonius Agrippa
 Angus Macfadyen as Marcus Crassus
 Rhona Mitra as Varinia, Spartacus' wife
 Ian McNeice as Lentulus Batiatus
 Paul Kynman as Crixus
 Paul Telfer as Gannicus
 James Frain as David
 Henry Simmons as Draba
 Chris Jarman as Nordo
 Ross Kemp as Cinna
 Ben Cross as Titus Glabrus, based on Gaius Claudius Glaber
 Niall Refoy as Publius Maximus, based on Publius Varinius
 George Calil as Pompey Magnus
 Richard Dillane as Julius Caesar

See also
 List of historical drama films
 List of films set in ancient Rome
 List of films featuring slavery
 Third Servile War
 Spartacus'' (2010 TV series)

References

External links

 
 
 

2004 television films
2004 films
American biographical films
Films set in ancient Rome
Films set in classical antiquity
Depictions of Spartacus on television
USA Network original films
Cultural depictions of Marcus Licinius Crassus
Gladiatorial combat in fiction
Films directed by Robert Dornhelm
2000s English-language films
2000s American films